Abdul-Aziz Mohamed Abood (born 27 May 1959) is a Tanzanian CCM politician and Member of Parliament for Morogoro Town constituency since 2010.

References

1959 births
Living people
Tanzanian Muslims
Chama Cha Mapinduzi MPs
Tanzanian MPs 2010–2015
Forest Hill Secondary School alumni